"Sweet Gingerbread Man" is a song with music by Michel Legrand and lyrics by Alan Bergman and Marilyn Bergman.  It was recorded originally for director Leonard Horn's 1970 screen version of Robert T. Westbrook's The Magic Garden of Stanley Sweetheart, a film about young people in Greenwich Village. The song for the film was performed by the Mike Curb Congregation, who went on to record other film songs, including "I Was Born in Love with You", another Legrand/Alan Bergman/Marilyn Bergman composition, this time for the 1970 film version of Wuthering Heights.

Artists who have recorded the song include Sammy Davis Jr., Jack Jones, the Muppets, Bobby Sherman and Sarah Vaughan.

In popular culture 
The 1972 Sammy Davis Jr. recording was used in the 2014 film adaptation of La liste de mes envies and in the credits of the third episode of Hawkeye (2021).

References

Songs with music by Michel Legrand
Songs with lyrics by Alan Bergman
Songs with lyrics by Marilyn Bergman
1970 songs